Suleymanovo (Söläymän) is a rural locality (a village) in Baydavletovsky Selsoviet, Zianchurinsky District, Bashkortostan, Russia. The population was 20 as of 2010. There is 1 street.

Geography 
Suleymanovo is located 26 km east of Isyangulovo (the district's administrative centre) by road. Baydavletovo is the nearest rural locality.

References 

Rural localities in Zianchurinsky District